5331 Erimomisaki, provisional designation , is a background asteroid on an eccentric orbit from the central regions of the asteroid belt, approximately  in diameter. It was discovered on 27 January 1990, by Japanese amateur astronomers Kin Endate and Kazuro Watanabe at the Kitami Observatory on Hokkaidō, Japan. The asteroid has a longer-than-average rotation period of 24.26 hours. It was named after Cape Erimo at the southern tip of Hokkaidō.

Orbit and classification 

Erimomisaki is a non-family asteroid from the main belt's background population. It orbits the Sun in the central main-belt at a distance of 1.7–3.8 AU once every 4 years and 7 months (1,678 days; semi-major axis of 2.76 AU). Its orbit has a relatively high eccentricity of 0.39 and an inclination of 12° with respect to the ecliptic.

Physical characteristics 

Erimomisaki spectral type is unknown. The Collaborative Asteroid Lightcurve Link (CALL) generically assumes it to be a carbonaceous C-type asteroid (as its semi-major axis is larger than 2.7 AU). However, based on the body's albedo (see below), it is rather a stony S-type asteroid.

Rotation period 

In December 2007, two rotational lightcurve of Erimomisaki were obtained from photometric observations by international collaboration between astronomers Silvano Casulli, Russel Durkee, Caleb Boe, Fiona Vincent and David Higgins. Lightcurve analysis gave a longer-than-average rotation period of 24.233 and 24.26 hours with a brightness amplitude of 0.42 and 0.27 magnitude, respectively. CALL adopts the longer period as its best result. While not being a slow rotator, Erimomisaki period is longer than that of most other asteroids, which have spin rates between 2 and 20 hours.

Diameter and albedo 

According to the surveys carried out by the Japanese Akari satellite and the NEOWISE mission of NASA's Wide-field Infrared Survey Explorer, Erimomisaki measures between 9.208 and 10.57 kilometers in diameter and its surface has an albedo between 0.2018 and 0.253. CALL generically assumes a carbonaceous albedo of 0.057 and consequently calculates a much larger diameter of 16.81 kilometers based on an absolute magnitude of 12.6.

Naming 

This minor planet was named after Cape Erimo at the south end of Hokkaidō, Japan. The official naming citation was published by the Minor Planet Center on 1 September 1993.

References

External links 
 Asteroid Lightcurve Database (LCDB), query form (info )
 Dictionary of Minor Planet Names, Google books
 Asteroids and comets rotation curves, CdR – Observatoire de Genève, Raoul Behrend
 Discovery Circumstances: Numbered Minor Planets (5001)-(10000) – Minor Planet Center
 
 

005331
Discoveries by Kin Endate
Discoveries by Kazuro Watanabe
Named minor planets
19900127